Dan Roberts is an American public address announcer best known for his work for the Utah Jazz of the National Basketball Association.  He has held this position since 1979, the entirety of the team's stay in Utah, and is the longest tenured PA announcer in the NBA.

Throughout each Utah Jazz game, Roberts is known to address the Vivint Smart Home Arena crowd by asking, "How 'bout this jazz?".  His favorite Jazz basketball player is Karl Malone, whose baskets he announced by saying, "The Mailman delivers!"

Dan's son, Jeremy, is also a PA Announcer, having worked for several professional and college teams since 1998.  He fills in for Dan on the few occasions he misses a game; to date Dan has missed fewer than 10 games in 41 years as the Jazz announcer.

Before joining the Jazz, Roberts was the public address announcer for Utah Utes men's basketball.  He called the 1979 national championship game featuring Larry Bird and Magic Johnson. Dan has also done radio, as well as voice overs for numerous television and radio commercials.

References

Living people
American sports announcers
Utah Jazz
National Basketball Association public address announcers
Year of birth missing (living people)